The Treasure of Villena is one of the greatest hoard finds of gold of the European Bronze Age. It comprises 59 objects made of gold, silver, iron and amber with a total weight of almost 10 kilograms, 9 of them of 23.5 karat gold. This makes it the most important find of prehistoric gold in the Iberian Peninsula and second in Europe, just behind that from the Royal Graves in Mycenae, Greece.

The gold pieces include eleven bowls, three bottles and 28 bracelets.

The iron pieces are the oldest found in the Iberian Peninsula and correspond to a stage in which iron was considered to be a precious metal, and so was hoarded. Archaeologists estimate the date of this trove at c. 1300-1000 BC, within the Late Argar, Post-Argar or Bronze of Levante period.

The hoard was found in December 1963 by archaeologist José María Soler 5 km from Villena, and since then has been the main attraction of Villena's Archaeological Museum. Its discovery was published in most of the Spanish media and also some abroad, mainly in France, Germany and the United States of America. It has been exhibited in Madrid, Alicante, Tokyo and Kyoto, and now there are two sets of copies of the whole treasure to be shown in exhibitions while the originals are permanently conserved in an armoured showcase at Villena's Archaeological Museum.

The same type of metalwork is also found in the big Eberswalde Hoard that was discovered in Brandenburg, Germany, in 1913.

See also 
Casco de Leiro
El Argar Noobee
Bronze Age Iberia
Prehistoric art

References 

M.I. Ayuntamiento de Villena, Villena ¡Un tesoro!, Touristic Guide to Villena. referring to the Treasure of Villena. (in English)

External links 

 Museo Arqueológico José María Soler, where it is exhibited.

Bronze Age art
Treasure troves of Spain
Bronze Age Europe
Gold objects
1963 archaeological discoveries
Ancient art in metal